

Notes
 Distance in km from the beginning of the canal in Buges, near Montargis.
 Each lock has a number and a number of meters for its rise or fall.

External links
Canal du Loing
Plan map
Project Babel

References

Canal du Loing
Canal du Loing